Bielik is a Slavic surname. Notable people with the surname include:

Bea Bielik (born 1980), American tennis player
Július Bielik (born 1962), Slovak footballer
Krystian Bielik (born 1998), Polish footballer
Paľo Bielik (1910–1983), Slovak film director, screenwriter and actor
Peter Bielik, Slovak historian

See also
Margański & Mysłowski EM-10 Bielik, Polish military training aircraft prototype
ORP Bielik (2003), a Kobben-class submarine acquired in 2003
Orzeł bielik, gold coins

References

Polish-language surnames
Slovak-language surnames